In mathematics, a Witt vector is an infinite sequence of elements of a commutative ring. Ernst Witt showed how to put a ring structure on the set of Witt vectors, in such a way that the ring of Witt vectors  over the finite field of order  is the ring of -adic integers. They have a highly non-intuitive structure upon first glance because their additive and multiplicative structure depends on an infinite set of recursive formulas which do not behave like addition and multiplication formulas for standard p-adic integers. We can then express a -adic integer as an infinite sumwhich gives a Witt vectorThen, the non-trivial additive and multiplicative structure in Witt vectors comes from using this map to give  an additive and multiplicative structure such that  induces a commutative ring morphism.

History 

In the 19th century, Ernst Eduard Kummer studied cyclic extensions of fields as part of his work on Fermat's Last Theorem. This led to the subject now known as Kummer theory. Let  be a field containing a primitive -th root of unity.

But suppose that  has characteristic . However, in this situation,  cannot contain a primitive -th root of unity. But consider the expression . By expanding using binomial coefficients we see that the operation of raising to the -th power, known here as the Frobenius homomorphism, introduces the factor  to every coefficient except the first and the last, and so modulo  these equations are the same. Therefore . Consequently, Kummer theory is never applicable to extensions whose degree is divisible by the characteristic.

The case where the characteristic divides the degree is today called Artin–Schreier theory because the first progress was made by Artin and Schreier. Their initial motivation was the Artin–Schreier theorem, which characterizes the real closed fields as those whose absolute Galois group has order two. This inspired them to ask what other fields had finite absolute Galois groups. In the midst of proving that no other such fields exist, they proved that degree  extensions of a field  of characteristic  were the same as splitting fields of Artin–Schreier polynomials. These are by definition of the form  By repeating their construction, they described degree  extensions. Abraham Adrian Albert used this idea to describe degree  extensions. Each repetition entailed complicated algebraic conditions to ensure that the field extension was normal.

Schmid generalized further to non-commutative cyclic algebras of degree . In the process of doing so, certain polynomials related to the addition of -adic integers appeared. Witt seized on these polynomials. By using them systematically, he was able to give simple and unified constructions of degree  field extensions and cyclic algebras. Specifically, he introduced a ring now called , the ring of -truncated -typical Witt vectors. Witt observes that the degree  analog of Artin–Schreier polynomials is

where .

Motivation

It is hard to provide an algebraic expression for addition and multiplication using this representation, as one faces the problem of carrying between digits. However, taking representative coefficients  is only one of many choices, and Hensel himself (the creator of -adic numbers) suggested the roots of unity in the field as representatives. Indeed, it is these fields (the fields of fractions of the rings) that motivated Hensel's choice. Call the field , with  an appropriate primitive  root of unity (over ). Since these representatives form a multiplicative set they can be thought of as characters. Some thirty years after Hensel's works Teichmüller studied these characters, which now bear his name, and this led him to a characterisation of the structure of the whole field in terms of the residue field.

Taking those representatives the expressions for addition and multiplication can be written in closed form. We now have the following problem (stated for the simplest case): given two infinite sequences of elements of  describe their sum and product as -adic integers explicitly. This problem was solved by Witt using Witt vectors.

Detailed motivational sketch

We derive the ring of -adic integers  from the finite field  using a construction which naturally generalizes to the Witt vector construction.

The ring  of -adic integers can be understood as the inverse limit of the rings  taken along the obvious projections. Specifically, it consists of the sequences  with  such that  for  That is, each successive element of the sequence is equal to the previous elements modulo a lower power of p; this is the inverse limit of the projections 

The elements of  can be expanded as (formal) power series in 

 

We will sketch a method of defining ring operations for such power series.

and one could make a similar definition for multiplication. However, this is not a closed formula, since the new coefficients are not in the allowed set

Representing elements in Fp as elements in the ring of Witt vectors W(Fp) 
They can be explicitly calculated (in terms of the original coefficient representatives )  as roots of  through Hensel lifting, the -adic version of Newton's method.

Note however that  is not additive, as the sum need not be a representative. Despite this, if  in  then  in

Representing elements in Zp as elements in the ring of Witt vectors W(Fp) 
An explicit algorithm can be given, as follows. Hence, . The process is then repeated, subtracting  and proceed likewise. This yields a sequence of congruences

So that 

and  implies: 

for 

It is clear that 

since 

 

for all  as  so the difference tends to 0 with respect to the -adic metric. The resulting coefficients will typically differ from the  modulo  except the first one.

Additional properties of elements in the ring of Witt vectors motivating general definition 
This can be used to describe addition, as follows. In particular, 

and thus

This completely determines  by the lift. Moreover, the congruence modulo  indicates that the calculation can actually be done in  satisfying the basic aim of defining a simple additive structure.

For  this step is already very cumbersome. Write

Just as for  a single th power is not enough: one must take

At this step, it becomes clear that one is actually working with addition of the form

This motivates the definition of Witt vectors.

Construction of Witt rings
Fix a prime number p. Define the Witt polynomials  by 

and in general

If  is p-torsionfree, then the ghost map is injective and the ghost components can be thought of as an alternative coordinate system for the -module of sequences (though note that the ghost map is not surjective unless  is p-divisible). 

The ring of (p-typical) Witt vectors  is defined by componentwise addition and multiplication of the ghost components. That is, that there is a unique way to make the set of Witt vectors over any commutative ring  into a ring such that:

In other words, 

 and 

The first few polynomials giving the sum and product of Witt vectors can be written down explicitly. For example, 

These are to be understood as shortcuts for the actual formulas. The same consideration applies to the ensuing components.

Examples of addition and multiplication 
As would be expected, the unit in the ring of Witt vectors  is the elementAdding this element to itself gives a non-trivial sequence, for example in ,sincewhich is not the expected behavior, since it doesn't equal . But, when we reduce with the map , we get .

Note if we have an element  and an element  thenshowing multiplication also behaves in a highly non-trivial manner.

Examples

 The Witt ring  of the finite field of order  is the ring of -adic integers written in terms of the Teichmüller representatives, as demonstrated above.

 The Witt ring  of a finite field of order  is the ring of integers of the unique unramified extension of degree  of the ring of -adic numbers . Note  for  the -th root of unity, hence .

Universal Witt vectors
The Witt polynomials for different primes  are special cases of universal Witt polynomials, which can be used to form a universal Witt ring (not depending on a choice of prime ).

and in general

We can use these polynomials to define the ring of universal Witt vectors or big Witt ring of any commutative ring  in much the same way as above (so the universal Witt polynomials are all homomorphisms to the ring ).

Generating Functions
Witt also provided another approach using generating functions.

Definition
Let  be a Witt vector and define

Then 

We can get the ghost components by taking the logarithmic derivative:

Sum
Now we can see  if . So that 

if  are the respective coefficients in the power series . Then 

Product
If we set  then

But

.

So that 

where  are polynomials of  So by similar induction, suppose 

 

then  can be solved as polynomials of

Ring schemes

Similarly, the rings of truncated Witt vectors, and the rings of universal Witt vectors correspond to ring schemes, called the truncated Witt schemes and the universal Witt scheme.

Moreover, the functor taking the commutative ring  to the set  is represented by the affine space , and the ring structure on  makes  into a ring scheme denoted . From the construction of truncated Witt vectors, it follows that their associated ring scheme  is the scheme  with the unique ring structure such that the morphism  given by the Witt polynomials is a morphism of ring schemes.

Commutative unipotent algebraic groups

Over an algebraically closed field of characteristic 0, any unipotent abelian connected algebraic group is isomorphic to a product of copies of the additive group . The analogue of this for fields of characteristic  is false: the truncated Witt schemes are counterexamples. (We make them into algebraic groups by forgetting the multiplication and just using the additive structure.) However, these are essentially the only counterexamples: over an algebraically closed field of characteristic , any unipotent abelian connected algebraic group is isogenous to a product of truncated Witt group schemes.

Universal property 
André Joyal explicated the universal property of the (p-typical) Witt vectors. The basic intuition is that the formation of Witt vectors is the universal way to deform a characteristic  ring to characteristic 0 together with a lift of its Frobenius endomorphism. To make this precise, define a -ring  to consist of a commutative ring  together with a map of sets  that is a -derivation, so that  satisfies the relations

 ;
 ;
 .

One may thus regard the notion of -ring as a suitable replacement for a Frobenius lift in the non -torsionfree case.

The collection of -rings and ring homomorphisms thereof respecting the -structure assembles to a category . One then has a forgetful functorwhose right adjoint identifies with the functor  of Witt vectors. In fact, the functor  creates limits and colimits and admits an explicitly describable left adjoint as a type of free functor; from this, it is not hard to show that  inherits local presentability from  so that one can construct the functor  by appealing to the adjoint functor theorem.

One further has that  restricts to a fully faithful functor on the full subcategory of perfect rings of characteristic p. Its essential image then consists of those -rings that are perfect (in the sense that the associated map  is an isomorphism) and whose underlying ring is -adically complete.

See also
p-derivation
Formal group
Artin–Hasse exponential
Necklace ring

References

Introductory 

 Notes on Witt vectors: a motivated approach - Basic notes giving the main ideas and intuition. Best to start here!
The Theory of Witt Vectors - Elementary introduction to the theory.
Complexe de de Rham-Witt et cohomologie cristalline - Note he uses a different but equivalent convention as in this article. Also, the main points in the introduction are still valid.

Applications 

 
 , section II.6

References 

 

Ring theory
Algebraic groups
Combinatorics on words